Saavi Ki Savaari is an Indian Hindi-language television drama series that premiered on 22 August 2022 on Colors TV. It also streams digitally on Voot. Produced under the banner of Dashami Creations, it stars Samridhi Shukla, Farman Haider and Fenil Umrigar. It is an adaptation of Colors Kannada's series Mithuna Raashi.

Premise
Saavi Goyal is a young girl who provides for her family by riding an auto-rickshaw, whom she fondly refers to as Chhatriprasad. Fate leads the young girl to marry a rich businessman, Nityam Dalmiya. Her journey from Goyal to Dalmiya, while simultaneously managing family relations, her business, and her married life, forms the crux of the story.

Cast

Main
Samridhi Shukla as Saavi Nityam Dalmiya (nee Goyal)  – An auto driver, Nootan's younger daughter, Sonam's younger sister, Ananya's cousin sister, Nityam's wife (2022–present)
 Farman Haider as Nityam Dalmiya – Vedika's son, Taashu's cousin brother, Sonam’s ex-fiancé and Saavi's husband (2022–present)
Fenil Umrigar as Sonam Goyal – Nootan's elder daughter, Saavi's elder sister, Ananya's cousin sister, Shiv's girlfriend and Nityam’s ex-fiancée (2022–present)

Recurring
Indira Krishnan as Vedika Dalmiya – Nityam's mother, Uma's daughter-in-law (2022–present) 
Anoop Puri as Kishore Dalmiya – Nityam's grandfather, Vedika's father-in-law (2022–present)
Chhaya Vora as Uma Dalmiya – Nityam's grandmother, Vedika's mother-in-law (2022–present)
Pankaj Bhatia as Himesh Dalmiya – Dimpi's husband, Taashu's father, Nityam's uncle (2022–present)
Mansi Srivastava as Dimpi Dalmiya – Himesh's second wife, Taashu's step-mother, Nityam's aunt (2022–present)
Sneha Chauhan as Taashu Dalmiya – Himesh's daughter, Dimpi's step-daughter, Nityam's cousin sister (2022–present)
Adish Vaidya as Shiv aka Raksham Dalmiya – Sonam's boyfriend,Vedika's elder son,Nityam's elder brother (2022–present)
Shravany Pilae as Nootan Goyal – Saavi and Sonam's mother, Brijesh's sister (2022–present)
Abhay Harpale as Brijesh Goyal – Ratna's husband, Ananya's father, Nootan's brother, Saavi and Sonam's maternal uncle (2022–present)
Soma Rathod as Ratna Goyal – Brijesh's wife, Ananya's mother, Saavi and Sonam's maternal aunt (2022–present)
Aayushee Sanglee as Ananya Goyal – Brijesh and Ratna's daughter, Saavi and Sonam's cousin sister (2022–present)
Saaransh Verma as Krishna – Shiv's bestfriend (2022–present)
Rajkumar Kanojia as Chunna – An auto driver, Saavi's rival (2022)
Unknown As Nootan's Husband And Saavi and Sonam's Father ( In memories and photo only)

Special appearances 
 Bharti Singh as Host
 Arjun Bijlani as Host
 Riteish Deshmukh as Host
 Kunal Jaisingh as Kunwar Kabir Singh from Muskuraane Ki Vajah Tum Ho
 Abhishek Malik as Yuvraj Singh Shekhawat from Muskuraane Ki Vajah Tum Ho
 Tejasswi Prakash as Pratha from Naagin 6
 Simba Nagpal as Rishabh Gujral from Naagin 6
 Surabhi Das as Nima Dengzongpa from Nima Denzongpa
Nyra Banerjee as Rani from Pishachini
 Harsh Rajput as Rakshit "Rocky" Rajput from Pishachini
 Shagun Sharma as Mohini Chaudhary from Harphoul Mohini
 Zebby Singh as Harphoul Chaudhary from Harphoul Mohini
 Anchal Sahu as Parineet Kakkar from Parineetii
 Tanvi Dogra as Neetii Juneja from Parineetii
 Ankur Verma as Rajeev Bajwa from Parineetii
Surbhi Chandna as Manmeet Shergill from Sherdil Shergill

Production

Casting 
In June 2022, Samridhi Shukla was cast for the titular role, with Farman Haider as the male lead character. 

Saraansh Verma made his comeback with Saavi Ki Savaari.

Development and release 
In June 2022, It was announced that Colors Marathi's Jeev Majha Guntala (original Colors Kannada's Mithuna Raashi) to remade in Hindi under the title Saavi Ki Savaari. 

First promo of the show release on 16 July 2022 featured Samridhi Shukla as Saavi, an autowali.

On 5 August 2022, channel unveil the new promo of show featuring Samridhi Shukla and Farman Haider with release date.

Filming 
In July 2022, The filming of show started in Ujjain. Later, it shifted to Mumbai.

References

2022 Indian television series debuts
Colors TV original programming
Hindi-language television shows
Indian television soap operas